Xanthorhoe labradorensis, the Labrador carpet moth, is a moth of the family Geometridae. The species was first described by Alpheus Spring Packard in 1867. It is found across Canada from Newfoundland and Labrador to British Columbia and Alaska, north to Yukon and the Northwest Territories, south in the east to Louisiana and Mississippi. The habitat consists of open wooded areas and edges.

The wingspan is about 25 mm. The wings are light grey and slightly mottled. The basal area is red brown and the black antemedian line is prominent. The area between the antemedian and postmedian lines is rust red and there is a small red-brown patch on the costa before the apex. The hindwings are light grey. There is one generation per year with adults on wing from late May to late August in the northern part of the range.

The larvae feed are polyphagous and feed on a wide range of plants, including herbs and woody plants.

References

Moths described in 1867
Xanthorhoe
Moths of North America